Pinewood is a town located on South Carolina Highway 261 at the southern entrance to the High Hills of Santee in Sumter County, South Carolina, United States. The population was 538 at the 2010 census. It is included in the Sumter, South Carolina Metropolitan Statistical Area.

History
Millford Plantation, Pinewood Depot, and St. Mark's Episcopal Church are listed on the National Register of Historic Places.

Geography
Pinewood is located at  (33.739475, -80.463326).

According to the United States Census Bureau, the town has a total area of 1.1 square miles (2.8 km), all land.

Demographics

At the 2000 census there were 459 people, 190 households, and 130 families in the town. The population density was 429.7 people per square mile (165.6/km). There were 237 housing units at an average density of 221.9 per square mile (85.5/km).  The racial makeup of the town was 43.14% White, 56.43% African American, 0.22% Asian, and 0.22% from two or more races. Hispanic or Latino of any race were 0.22%.

Of the 190 households 29.5% had children under the age of 18 living with them, 41.6% were married couples living together, 20.5% had a female householder with no husband present, and 31.1% were non-families. 30.5% of households were one person and 18.4% were one person aged 65 or older. The average household size was 2.42 and the average family size was 2.98.

The age distribution was 26.1% under the age of 18, 7.0% from 18 to 24, 24.4% from 25 to 44, 22.4% from 45 to 64, and 20.0% 65 or older. The median age was 40 years. For every 100 females, there were 80.0 males. For every 100 females age 18 and over, there were 70.4 males.

The median household income was $19,583 and the median family income  was $29,688. Males had a median income of $31,750 versus $16,902 for females. The per capita income for the town was $10,853. About 15.8% of families and 19.7% of the population were below the poverty line, including 17.9% of those under age 18 and 31.1% of those age 65 or over.

See also
 Millford Plantation
 Pinewood Depot

References

Towns in Sumter County, South Carolina
Towns in South Carolina
High Hills of Santee